Patrick Burke (born 1995) is an Irish hurler who plays for Antrim Senior Championship club Ruairí Óg and at inter-county level as vice-captain of the Antrim senior hurling team. He usually lines out as a centre-back.

Career

A member of the Ruairí Óg club, Burke joined the club's senior team in 2012. Since then he has won two Ulster Club Championship titles as well as three County Championship titles. Burke made his first appearance on the inter-county scene as a member of the Antrim minor team that won an Ulster Minor Championship title in 2013, before winning three successive Ulster Under-21 Championship titles. Burke made his debut with the Antrim senior hurling team in 2015. Since then he has won one Joe McDonagh Cup title, three successive Ulster Championship titles and two National League Division 2A titles.

Honours

Ruairí Óg
Ulster Senior Club Hurling Championship: 2015, 2018
Antrim Senior Hurling Championship: 2014, 2015, 2018

Antrim
Ulster Senior Hurling Championship: 2015, 2016, 2017
Joe McDonagh Cup: 2020
National Hurling League Division 2A: 2017, 2020
Ulster Under-21 Hurling Championship: 2014, 2015, 2016
Ulster Minor Hurling Championship: 2013

References

External links
Paddy Burke profile at the Antrim GAA website

1995 births
Living people
O'Donovan Rossa (Antrim) hurlers
Antrim inter-county hurlers